Die letzte Kommune  ("The Last Commune") is a 2013 written play in German language by Peter Lund (lyrics), with music by Thomas Zaufke and was specifically written for GRIPS-Theater, Berlin. The world premiere took place there on September 21, 2013. It's a piece for three generations and was a long-running hit for the house in 2013.

Synopsis 
Drama in the house Puhlmann: Grandpa Friedrich has burned his kitchen - almost! With his 78 years, he must have in a nursing home? No, Grandpa Friedrich can not get out of his old apartment. Not for nothing he has hoarded his six-figure nest-egg in ice cream box. With this money, he starts one last great adventure and founds a municipality with his old pal, the wacker proletarian metalworker Hannes Majowski. As in the past, but very different. But then Lotte enters the stage, the granddaughter of Hannes, who wrote a seminar paper on the Kommune 1...

Ensembles and productions

Performance in Berlin (GRIPS-Cast)
September 21st 2013  to June 25th  2014

Cast
Director: Franziska Steiof
Choreography: Clébio Oliveira
Drama: Henrik Adler
Stage: Jan A. Schroeder
Costumes: Sibylle Meyer

Actors
Christian Giese (Hannes Majowski) 
Jumin Hoffmann (Philipp Paul)
Dietrich Lehmann (Friedrich Puhlmann)
Regina Lemnitz (Josephine Bouvier)
Jens Mondalski (Michael)
Maria Perlick (Charlotte)
Kilian Ponert (Atze)
René Schubert (Georg)
Regine Seidler (Heidi)

Musicians
Martin Fonfara (drums)
Johannes Gehlmann (gituar)
Robert Neumann (keys)
Thomas Keller (sax)
Carsten Schmelzer (bass)

Reviews

"bridging the gap between generations" (Christian Rakow, Berliner Zeitung vom 23. September 2013)

Notes

External links
Materials for "Die letzte Kommune" - Ein Schauspiel mit Musik von Peter Lund und Thomas Zaufke, GRIPS-Theater, 21.9.13 (PDF; 1,9 MB)

2013 plays
German plays